Glenn O'Brien (March 2, 1947 – April 7, 2017) was an American writer who focused largely on the subjects of art, music, and fashion. He was featured for many years as "The Style Guy" in GQ magazine and published a book with that title. He worked as an editor at a number of publications, and published the arts and literature magazine Bald Ego from 2003 to 2005.

Life and career
O'Brien was born in Cleveland, Ohio, where he attended the Jesuit St. Ignatius High School. O'Brien went to Georgetown University and edited the Georgetown Journal, which was founded by Condé Nast. O'Brien later studied film at the Columbia Graduate School of Arts and Sciences.

In his early career, O'Brien was a member of Andy Warhol's Factory. He was the first editor of Interview from 1971 to 1974. After his departure, he continued to write for the magazine and returned as editor several times, with a nearly 20-year association with the title.  He was a music critic for the publication in the punk era for which he penned the influential column "Glenn O'Brien's Beat".

In the late 1970s, O'Brien had a band called Konelrad, which he described as a "socialist-realist rock band."

From 1978 to 1982, O'Brien hosted a New York city Public-access television cable TV show called TV Party. During this period, O'Brien edited several iconic downtown novels, including Kathy Acker's Blood and Guts in High School  and The Correct Sadist by Terence Sellers.

In 1980, he wrote the screenplay (which he also co-produced with Patrick Montgomery) for a film to be called New York Beat, starring Jean-Michel Basquiat It was released in 2000 as "Downtown 81", with post-production managed by O'Brien and Maripol.

In June 1980, O'Brien's article Graffiti '80: The State of the Outlaw Art" was published in High Times magazine. It was the first major survey of the burgeoning graffiti art scene, which featured Basquiat, Fab 5 Freddy and Lee Quiñones.

After leaving TV Party, in addition to continuing his writing career, he attempted a stint as a stand-up comedian, and was a contributing editor of Allure, Harper's Bazaar, and Creative Director of advertising at Barneys New York. For 10 years, he wrote a monthly column for Artforum magazine. O'Brien edited Madonna's 1992 Sex book. He had been introduced to Madonna a decade prior through her relationship with Basquiat. He also worked with her on The Girlie Show World Tour book in 1993.

In January 2008, he was named editorial director of Brant Publications, which includes Interview Magazine as well as Art in America and Antiques.  In June 2009 it was announced that he had left his position with Brant Publications.

He lent his collection of early Basquiat works to various exhibitions, including Deitch Projects, and is a co-author of a major volume on the artist.

O'Brien died of complications from pneumonia in Manhattan on April 7, 2017, at the age of 70. Madonna called O'Brien "an amazing soul and a creative genius" in a statement on Twitter.

Awards and honors
On February 17, 2009, O'Brien was named one of Top 10 Most Stylish Men in America by GQ.

Published works

References

External links
Official website for Glenn O'Brien

Style Guy Blog
List of article, interviews and reviews by Glenn O’Brien
O'Brien's final interview as Editor-In-Chief of Interview magazine in The Block Issue 18
Glenn O'Brien on How to Be a Man on YouTube

1947 births
2017 deaths
American magazine editors
American music critics
American fashion journalists
Columbia University School of the Arts alumni
Georgetown University alumni
Writers from Cleveland
Writers from New York City
Deaths from pneumonia in New York City
People associated with The Factory